Francesco De Robertis (1902–1959) was an Italian screenwriter, film editor and director. His semi-documentary film-making style of the early 1940s has been credited as an influence on the development of Italian neorealism.

Selected filmography

Director
 Men on the Sea Floor (1941)
 The Lovers of Ravello (1951)
 Heroic Charge (1952)
 Uomini ombra (1954)
 Mizar (Sabotaggio in mare) (1954)

Screenwriter
 The White Ship (1941)

References

Bibliography
Bondanella, Peter. A History of Italian Cinema. Continuum, 2009.

External links

1902 births
1959 deaths
Italian film editors
Italian film directors
20th-century Italian screenwriters
Italian male screenwriters
20th-century Italian male writers